Martin Hollund (born 11 August 1974) is a Norwegian former footballer who played as a goalkeeper. During his active career he played for Brann and Løv-Ham in Norway, and Hartlepool United in England. He has later worked as a goalkeeper coach for Løv-Ham and Fyllingdalen.

Career
He hails from Bømlo. While playing for Brann, he was sold to Hartlepool United in 1997, playing 117 league games over five seasons. He retired from top-level football after the 2006 season. In 2007, he was a goalkeeper coach for Løv-Ham as well as a striker for Bremnes.

Even though he had retired from professional football, Hollund was on the bench for Løv-Ham in the 2010 season, and in the 2011 season he was Løv-Ham's third choice goalkeeper. On 3 October 2011 he made his first appearance for the club since he retired in 2006, when he came in as a substitute after Johan Thorbjørnsen was sent off. He also played the next match due to Thorbjørnsen's suspension and second-choice goalkeeper Harald Aksnes' injury.

After the merge of Løv-Ham and Fyllingen, Hollund continued as goalkeeper coach of Fyllingsdalen.

Statistics

1Includes one Third Division play-off match.

References

1974 births
Living people
People from Hordaland
People from Stord
People from Bømlo
Norwegian footballers
Eliteserien players
Norwegian expatriate footballers
Expatriate footballers in England
Hartlepool United F.C. players
Løv-Ham Fotball players
SK Brann players
Bremnes IL players
Association football goalkeepers
Sportspeople from Vestland